The Daily Gazette is an independent, family-owned daily newspaper published in Schenectady, New York. The Daily Gazette also owns and operates The Amsterdam Recorder, The Gloversville Leader-Herald and Your Niskayuna.

History 
The Daily Gazette was founded as a weekly newspaper by the Marlette family in 1894. It was sold to the Schenectady Printing Association in September of that year, and expanded into a daily newspaper, while still publishing its weekly edition. By 1895, it had a circulation of 3,000 copies a day.

In 1990, the paper began publishing a Sunday edition. In 1996, the Gazette launched its free website, which it turned into a subscriber-based website in 2003.  it offers a select number of free articles online per month, with full access available by subscription.

Judith Patrick became editor of the newspaper in 2012. She was the first woman to have the position. The board of directors appointed John DeAugustine as publisher in 2013.

In December 2019, the Gazette Company acquired the Amsterdam Recorder. Then, in 2021, the Gazette Company acquired The Gloversville Leader-Herald.

Particular Schenectady notation 
The Daily Gazette is known for typically using the short form Sch'dy for Schenectady in its headlines and headings.

In popular culture 
A prop Daily Gazette front page was featured in the 2012 film The Place Beyond the Pines 

The Gazette is cited in the 1945 film Objective, Burma!, the journalist character Mark Williams indicates his column is syndicated in The Gazette.

References

External links 
 

Daily newspapers published in New York (state)
Publications established in 1812
Schenectady, New York